Gleason Belzile (August 30, 1898 – July 25, 1950) was a Canadian politician and notary. He was elected to the House of Commons of Canada in 1945 as a Member of the Liberal Party to represent the riding of Rimouski. He was re-elected in 1949. He was made Parliamentary Assistant to the Minister of Finance for three terms. He died while in office and a by-election was held in which Joseph Hervé Rousseau succeeded him.

External links
 

1898 births
1950 deaths
Members of the House of Commons of Canada from Quebec
Liberal Party of Canada MPs
Quebec notaries